The 493d Bombardment Group is a former United States Army Air Forces unit that was assigned to the 92d Bombardment Wing during World War II.  It the last bombardment group to be assigned to Eighth Air Force.  It flew combat missions in the strategic bombing campaign against Germany until shortly before V-E Day, then returned to the United States for inactivation.  In 2002, the group was converted to provisional status as the 493d Air Expeditionary Group and assigned to Air Mobility Command to activate or inactivate as needed.

History

World War II

Initial activation and training in the United States
The 493d Bombardment Group was first activated at McCook Army Air Field, Nebraska, with the 860th, 861st, 862d and 863d Bombardment Squadrons assigned. The 863d Squadron was a former antisubmarine unit that had become surplus when the Navy assumed its mission, and was used to form the cadre for the group and its squadrons. The group's formation was delayed by an administrative error that caused some of the unit's personnel to report to Davis-Monthan Field, Arizona instead of to McCook. It was not until January that all personnel were at McCook. By this time, the group had transferred on paper to Elveden Hall, England. The ground personnel of the group in the United States had been used to form Boeing B-29 Superfortress units being activated by Second Air Force, while the group's air echelon remained in Nebraska to conduct training on their assigned Consolidated B-24 Liberators. Meanwhile, Eighth Air Force formed a new ground echelon for the group in England from other units assigned to the 3d Bombardment Division. This ground echelon moved to the group's combat station, RAF Debach, in April 1944. Additional officers and men, chiefly from the 34th Bombardment Group training at Blythe Army Air Base, California, were assigned to the Group in February and March.

Combat in Europe

The group was established at Debach by mid-May and flew its first combat mission on D-Day, 6 June 1944, making it the last in Eighth Air Force to become operational.  It continued to fly Liberators until 24 August 1944, when it was withdrawn from combat to convert to Boeing B-17 Flying Fortresses, along with other units of the 93d Bombardment Wing, as Eighth Air Force concentrated all its Liberators in the 2d Bombardment Division.  It resumed combat missions with the B-17 on 8 September 1944. The squadron concentrated its attacks on military and industrial targets in Germany, attacking an ordnance depot in Magdeburg, factories near Frankfurt, and a synthetic oil manufacturing plant at Merseburg.  It also attacked lines of communications, including a railroad tunnel at Ahrweiler, bridges at Irlich, and marshalling yards near Cologne.

The group was occasionally diverted from the strategic bombing campaign to attack tactical targets.  It supported Operation Overlord, the Normandy invasion, striking artillery batteries, airfields and bridges.  It struck enemy ground forces south of Caen and during Operation Cobra, the breakout at St Lo.  It bombed German fortifications to support Operation Market Garden, airborne attacks attempting to secure a bridgehead across the Rhine in the Netherlands, and attacked communications during the Battle of the Bulge.  Toward the end of the war, it also supported Operation Varsity, the airborne assault across the Rhine in Germany.

In February 1945, the 862d Squadron replaced the 3d Scouting Force, and its crews were distributed to the other squadrons of the group. The squadron returned to group control in May. The squadron flew its last combat mission against marshalling yards near Nauen on 20 April 1945, although it flew food-dropping missions in early May, dropping more than 450 tons of supplies. At war's end, the 493d had flown 47 Missions with the Liberator and 110 with the Flying Fortress. It claimed the destruction of 11 enemy aircraft, but lost 41 in combat. In late August, the squadron assembled at Sioux Falls Army Air Field, South Dakota, where it was inactivated on 28 August 1945.

Expeditionary unit
In June 2002, the group was converted to provisional status as the 493d Air Expeditionary Group and assigned to Air Mobility Command to activate or inactivate as needed for contingency operations. There is no indication in unclassified sources that the unit has been active.

Lineage
 Constituted as the 493d Bombardment Group, Heavy on 14 September 1943
 Activated on 1 November 1943
 Inactivated on 28 August 1945
 Redesignated 493d Air Expeditionary Group and converted to provisional status on 12 June 2002

Assignments
 Second Air Force, 1 November 1943
 Eighth Air Force, 1 January 1944
 93d Combat Bombardment Wing, c. 17 April 1944
 13th Combat Bombardment Wing (later 13th Bombardment Wing), c. March–c. 12 August 1945
 Second Air Force, 12–28 August 1945
 Air Mobility Command to activate or inactivate as needed, 12 June 2002

Components
 860th Bombardment Squadron, 1 November 1943 – 28 August 1945
 861st Bombardment Squadron, 1 November 1943 – 28 August 1945
 862d Bombardment Squadron, 1 November 1943 – 28 August 1945
 863d Bombardment Squadron, 1 November 1943 – 28 August 1945

Stations
 McCook Army Airfield, Nebraska, 1 November 1943 – 1 January 1944
 Elveden Hall (AAF-116), England, 1 January 1944
 RAF Debach (AAF-152), England, 17 April 1944 – 6 August 1945
 Sioux Falls Army Air Field, South Dakota, c. 13–28 August 1945

Aircraft
 Consolidated B-24 Liberator, 1943–1944
 Boeing B-17 Flying Fortress, 1943–1945

Campaigns

References

Notes
 Explanatory notes

 Citations

Bibliography

 
 
 
 
 

 Further reading
 
 Freeman, Roger A. (1991) The Mighty Eighth: The Colour Record. Cassell & Co.

External links

Bombardment groups of the United States Army Air Forces
Military units and formations established in 1943
Strategic bombing units and formations